Jean-Marc Garcia is a French rugby league footballer who represented France in the 1995 and 2000 World Cups.

Playing career
Garcia played for AS Saint Estève in the French Rugby League Championship. He was first selected for France in 1991 and spent the rest of the decade as part of the side, playing in forty test matches. 

In 1995 Garcia transferred to the Sheffield Eagles. At the end of the year he was named as part of France's World Cup side. Garcia remained with Sheffield for three seasons, leaving at the end of 1997 to rejoin AS Saint Estève. He again played for France in the 2000 World Cup.

French captain 1996–2000.

References

1971 births
Living people
AS Saint Estève players
France national rugby league team captains
France national rugby league team players
French rugby league players
Lézignan Sangliers players
Rugby league wingers
Sheffield Eagles (1984) players